Venezuela competed at the 1984 Summer Olympics in Los Angeles, United States. 26 competitors, 25 men and 1 woman, took part in 29 events in 10 sports.

Medalists

Athletics

Men's Decathlon 
 Douglas Fernández
 Final Result — 7553 points (→ 18th place)

Boxing

Men's Light Flyweight (– 48 kg)
 Marcelino Bolivar →  Bronze Medal
 First Round — Defeated Nelson Jamili (Philippines), on points (5:0)
 Second Round — Defeated Agapito Gómez (Spain), on points (4:1)
 Quarterfinals — Defeated Carlos Motta (Guatemala), on points (5:0)
 Semifinals — Lost to Paul Gonzales (United States), on points (1:4)

Men's Bantamweight (– 54 kg)
 Manuel Vilchez
 First Round — Lost to John Siryakibbe (Uganda), on points (2:3)

Men's Featherweight (– 57 kg)
 Omar Catari →  Bronze Medal
 First Round — Bye
 Second Round — Defeated Azzedine Said (Algeria), RSC-2
 Third Round — Defeated Satoru Higashi (Japan), on points (4:1)
 Quarterfinals — Defeated Park Hyung-Ok (South Korea), on points (4:1)
 Semifinals — Lost to Meldrick Taylor (United States), on points (0:5)

Cycling

Two cyclists represented Venezuela in 1984.

Individual road race
 Enrique Campos
 Fernando Correa

Diving

Men's 3m Springboard
 Carlos Isturiz
 Preliminary Round — 483.00 (→ did not advance, 21st place)

Fencing

Two fencers, both men, represented Venezuela in 1984.

Men's foil
 José Rafael Magallanes

Men's épée
 José Rafael Magallanes

Men's sabre
 Ildemaro Sánchez

Judo

Sailing

Shooting

Swimming

Men's 100m Freestyle 
 Alberto Mestre Sosa
 Heat — 50.99
 Final — 50.70 (→ 6th place)

Men's 200m Freestyle
 Alberto Mestre Sosa
 Heat — 1:50.73
 Final — 1:50.23 (→ 5th place)

 Jean-Marie François
 Heat — 1:55.28 (→ did not advance, 29th place)

Men's 400m Freestyle
 Jean-Marie François
 Heat — 4:03.08 (→ did not advance, 24th place)

Men's 100m Backstroke 
 Giovanni Frigo
 Heat — 59.34 (→ did not advance, 25th place)

Men's 200m Backstroke 
 Giovanni Frigo
 Heat — 2:07.56 (→ did not advance, 21st place)

Men's 100m Breaststroke
 Jorge Henão
 Heat — 1:09.01 (→ did not advance, 40th place)

Men's 200m Breaststroke
 Jorge Henão
 Heat — 2:28.03 (→ did not advance, 31st place)

Men's 100m Butterfly
 Rafael Vidal Castro
 Heat — 54.33
 Final — 54.27 (→ 4th place)

Men's 200m Butterfly
 Rafael Vidal Castro
 Heat — 1:59.15
 Final — 1:57.51 (→  Bronze Medal)

 Alberto José Umana
 Heat — 2:05.29 (→ did not advance, 23rd place)

Men's 4 × 100 m Freestyle Relay 
 Alberto Mestre Sosa, Alberto José Umana, Rafael Vidal, and Jean-Marie François
 Heat — 3:30.24 (→ did not advance, 12th place)

Men's 4 × 200 m Freestyle Relay 
 Jean-Marie François, Alberto José Umana, Rafael Vidal Castro, and Alberto Mestre Sosa
 Heat — 7:31.79 (→ did not advance, 10th place)

Men's 4 × 100 m Medley Relay
 Giovanni Frigo, Jorge Henão, Rafael Vidal Castro, and Alberto Mestre Sosa
 Heat — 3:55.12 (→ did not advance, 13th place)

Synchronized swimming

References

External links
 Official Olympic Reports
 International Olympic Committee results database

Nations at the 1984 Summer Olympics
1984
1984 in Venezuelan sport